Daniel O'Donnell (born 27 February 1939) is a Scottish retired professional footballer who played as an inside forward in the Football League for Brentford. He also played in the Scottish League for Brechin City and hometown club Dumbarton.

Career statistics

References

1939 births
Scottish footballers
English Football League players
Brentford F.C. players
Living people
Sportspeople from Dumbarton
Footballers from West Dunbartonshire
Association football inside forwards
Dumbarton F.C. players
Brechin City F.C. players
Vale of Leven F.C. players
Scottish Football League players
Southern Football League players
Kirkintilloch Rob Roy F.C. players
Scotland junior international footballers